This is a list of notable current and former inmates at the United States Penitentiary in Atlanta. Inmates who were released from custody prior to 1982 are not listed on the Federal Bureau of Prisons website.

Mafia figures

Sports figures

Fraudsters

Political prisoners

Public officials

Others

See also
United States Penitentiary, Atlanta
List of U.S. federal prisons
Federal Bureau of Prisons
Incarceration in the United States

References

Prisoners and detainees by prison
List Atlanta
Lists of prisoners and detainees